"Rain" is a single from British rock band Status Quo's album Blue for You. It was written by Rick Parfitt.

"Rain" was intended for Blue for You'''s predecessor On the Level – but, at the time of the recording sessions, Parfitt had not completed the song and so it was held over. It followed guitarist Francis Rossi's introduction to speed; "That's why songs like 'Rain' were so edgy and fast," he explained.

The song was reprised, in 2014, for the band's thirty-first studio album Aquostic (Stripped Bare). It was featured in the ninety-minute launch performance for the album at London's Roundhouse on 22 October, broadcast live by BBC Radio 2 as part of their In Concert'' series.

Track listing 
 "Rain" (Parfitt) (4.33)
 "You Lost the Love" (Rossi/Young) (2.58)

Charts

References 

Status Quo (band) songs
1976 singles
Songs written by Rick Parfitt